Cheshmeh Balvark is a village in Bazan Rural District, in the Central District of Javanrud County, Kermanshah Province, Iran. At the 2006 census, its population was 78, in 16 families.

References 

Populated places in Javanrud County